Kate Bollinger is an American folk singer-songwriter from Charlottesville, Virginia.

History
Bollinger was introduced to music at a young age, as her mother was in a musical and her two brothers were in bands.

Bollinger self-released her first EP in 2017 titled Key West. After writing several folk singles, she wrote R&B single "Test" in 2018 with friend John Wehmeyer, which brought her more attention. The song was chosen as an Editor's Pick at Atwood Magazine.. Her following 2019 EP I Don't Wanna Lose was recorded when Bollinger had free time in a studio, with very little production or mastering. "Candy", the second track of the EP, was an inspiration for Kanye West's song "Donda". In 2020, Bollinger released her second EP, A Word Becomes a Sound.

Although she had previously been hesitant to do so, upon graduating from the University of Virginia in 2020, Bollinger decided to pursue music as a full-time career.

She released the EP Look at It in the Light in 2022 through Ghostly International.

Bollinger's work has been highlighted several times at The Line of Best Fit, and she has performed for NPR's World Cafe.

Discography
EPs
 Key West (2017)
 I Don't Wanna Lose (2019)
 A Word Becomes a Sound (2020)
 Look at It in the Light (2022)

References

External links
 
 

Ghostly International artists
Musicians from Charlottesville, Virginia
Living people
Year of birth missing (living people)